The McCullagh Baronetcy, of Lismarra in the Parish of Carnmoney in the County of Antrim, was a title in the Baronetage of the United Kingdom. It was created on 1 July 1935 for the Northern Ireland businessman and politician Sir Crawford McCullagh. The title became extinct on the death of the second Baronet in 1974.

McCullagh Baronets, of Lismarra (1935)
Sir Crawford McCullagh, 1st Baronet (1868–1948)
Sir Joseph Crawford McCullagh, 2nd Baronet (1907–1974)

References

Extinct baronetcies in the Baronetage of the United Kingdom